The 2019–20 Oklahoma City Thunder season was the 12th season of the franchise in Oklahoma City and the 53rd in the National Basketball Association (NBA). This was the Thunder's first season since 2007–08 without Russell Westbrook, as he was traded to the Houston Rockets for Chris Paul and future draft picks on July 11, 2019. The trade reunited Westbrook with former Thunder teammate James Harden, who had played for the team from 2009 to 2012. The trade also marked Chris Paul's first time since 2006–07 playing in Oklahoma City after playing his first two seasons there when he was a member of the New Orleans Hornets (the Hornets temporarily relocated to Oklahoma City for two seasons following the destruction caused by Hurricane Katrina in New Orleans). This trade was preceded by a trade where Paul George was sent to the Los Angeles Clippers for Danilo Gallinari, Shai Gilgeous-Alexander, and a record 5 future 1st round draft picks on July 7.

The season was suspended by the league officials following the games of March 11 after it was reported that Rudy Gobert tested positive for COVID-19. The Thunder were one of the 22 teams invited to the NBA Bubble on June 4.

The Thunder faced the Rockets in the First round. However, they lost in a decisive Game 7, extending the Thunder's postseason series victory drought to 4 seasons. Despite their loss, the Thunder set some records during the series, such as Chris Paul becoming the oldest player to record a triple-double, and rookie Luguentz Dort joined LeBron James and Kobe Bryant as the only players 21 years old or younger to score over 25 points in a Game 7 playoff game.

As of 2022, this season marked the last time the Thunder made the playoffs.

After 5 years as head coach, Billy Donovan’s contract was not renewed following the season, and both sides agreed to mutually part ways.

Previous season
The Thunder finished the 2018–19 season 49–33 to finish in fourth place in the Northwest Division, sixth in the Western Conference and qualified for the playoffs. Last season featured a near MVP-season for Paul George, finishing 3rd in MVP voting. The Thunder lost to the Portland Trail Blazers in five games after a series-clinching three pointer by Damian Lillard over George.

Offseason

Draft picks

The Thunder had only their own first-round pick entering the draft. The Thunder traded their 2019 second-round pick in the Hamidou Diallo trade from the Charlotte Hornets back in 2018. On draft night, the Thunder traded the draft rights to Brandon Clarke, the twenty-first pick, to the Memphis Grizzlies in exchange for the draft rights to Darius Bazley, the twenty-third pick, and a 2024 second-round pick. The Thunder, after the 2019 NBA Draft night and the conclusion of player acquisitions and transactions, ended with Princeton High School forward Darius Bazley.

Trades

On July 6, the Thunder traded the draft rights to Brandon Clarke, the twenty-first pick, to the Memphis Grizzlies in exchange for the draft rights to Darius Bazley, the twenty-third pick, and a 2024 second-round pick. On July 6, it was reported that the Thunder traded Paul George to the LA Clippers in exchange for a record-setting of draft choices after free agent Kawhi Leonard signed with the Clippers, which was finalized on July 10. Leonard had spent the offseason recruiting George, who reportedly requested a trade to join Leonard and the Clippers. The Thunder traded George to the LA Clippers in exchange for Shai Gilgeous-Alexander, Danilo Gallinari, a 2021 first-round pick via MIA, a 2022 first-round pick via LAC, a 2023 first-round pick via MIA, rights to swap 2023 first-round picks with LAC, a 2024 first-round pick via LAC, rights to swap 2025 first-round picks with LAC and a 2026 first-round pick via LAC. After re-signing with the Thunder last season, George joins the Clippers after being named his first All-NBA First Team, a finalist for the Defensive Player of the Year Award, earning All-Defensive First Team honors and finishing third for the NBA Most Valuable Player award.  Following George's trade request, Russell Westbrook's future with the Thunder was "certainly in question." After trading George, it was reported that the Thunder traded Jerami Grant to the Denver Nuggets in exchange for a 2020 first-round pick, which was finalized on July 8. By trading Grant, the Thunder saved $39 million in salary and tax. 

On July 11, it was reported that the Thunder traded Russell Westbrook to the Houston Rockets in exchange for Chris Paul, rights to swap 2021 first-round picks, a 2024 first-round pick, rights to swap 2025 first-round picks and a 2026 first-round pick, which was finalized on July 16. After trading George, Westbrook's future with the Thunder was in jeopardy with the two sides working together on a trade. Sam Presti worked with Westbrook and his representatives to honor Westbrook's desires of playing with the Houston Rockets to reunite with James Harden. Since the 2019 NBA Draft, the Thunder accumulated eight first-round picks as the Thunder started to embrace a full rebuild of the team. After eleven seasons with the Thunder, Westbrook left the Thunder as the franchise's all-time leader in points, second in assists, third in rebounds and steals. Westbrook was the NBA Most Valuable Player in the 2016-17 season, an eight-time All-Star, All-NBA First Team honors twice, All-NBA Second Team honors five times, as well as two scoring titles and an assists leader title.

Free agency

For this offseason, free agency began on June 30th, 2019 while the July moratorium ended on July 6. Jawun Evans, Raymond Felton, Markieff Morris and Nerlens Noel were set to hit unrestricted free agency. On July 6, Nerlens Noel agreed to a deal to stay with the Thunder. The same day, Markieff Morris signed a deal with the Detroit Pistons. Evans was not re-signed by the Thunder, joined the Raptors 905 of the NBA G League.

On June 30 and July 1, it was reported that Mike Muscala and Alec Burks agreed to a deal with the Thunder. However after the Paul George trade, the Thunder allowed both Muscala and Burks to re-evaluate their situations to remain with the Thunder. Burks instead signed a one-year deal with the Golden State Warriors while Muscala remained with the Thunder. Muscala will later sign with the Thunder on July 10.

On July 6, Luguentz Dort signed a two-way contract with the Thunder. Dort came undrafted out of Arizona State. On August 13, Justin Patton signed a contract with the Thunder. Patton spent the 2018-19 season with the Philadelphia 76ers. To fill in the other two-way slot, Devon Hall signed a two-way contract with the Thunder on September 4. Hall was originally selected 53rd overall in the 2018 NBA Draft but did not sign a contract in the 2018-19 season, instead playing a season with Cairns Taipans.

On July 25, Donte Grantham was waived by the Thunder. On August 1, Patrick Patterson was waived by the Thunder following a contract buyout.

Front office and coaching changes
On July 23, the Thunder announced David Akinyooye, Dave Bliss, Mark Daigneault, Brian Keefe and Mike Wilks as assistant coaches. Akinyooye joins the Thunder after serving four seasons as the assistant coach for the Oklahoma City Blue. Bliss joins the coaching staff after serving as a senior player development for the Thunder with previous experience with the New York Knicks. Daigneault joins the Thunder after serving five seasons as the head coach for the Blue. Keefe joins the Thunder after previously serving five seasons with the Thunder back in 2008 to 2013. Wilks joins the coaching staff after serving as a senior pro evaluation scout for the Thunder. Wilks became the second former Thunder player since Royal Ivey to join the team's coaching staff.

Roster

Standings

Conference

Division

Game log

Preseason

|- style="background:#cfc;"
| 1
| October 8
| Dallas
| 
| Shai Gilgeous-Alexander (24)
| Danilo Gallinari (9)
| Dennis Schröder (5)
| BOK Center12,055
| 1–0
|- style="background:#cfc;"
| 2
| October 10
| New Zealand Breakers
| 
| Steven Adams (19)
| Steven Adams (10)
| Dennis Schröder (6)
| Chesapeake Energy ArenaN/A
| 2-0
|- style="background:#fcc;"
| 3
| October 14
| @ Dallas
| 
| Gilgeous-Alexander & Gallinari (16)
| Shai Gilgeous-Alexander (8)
| | Dennis Schröder (6)
| American Airlines Center15,305
| 2–1
|- style="background:#fcc;"
| 4
| October 16
| Memphis
| 
| Devon Hall (19)
| Danilo Gallinari (10)
| Bazley & Schröder (6)
| Chesapeake Energy Arena1,000
| 2–2

|- style="background:#cfc;"
| 1
| July 24
| @ Boston
| 
|Adams & Gilgeous-Alexander (17)
|Adams & Bazley (7)
| Chris Paul (5)
| Visa Athletic CenterNo In-Person Attendance
| 1–0
|- style="background:#cfc;"
| 2
| July 26
|  Philadelphia
| 
| Shai Gilgeous-Alexander (16)
| Steven Adams (9)
| Shai Gilgeous-Alexander (5)
| HP Field HouseNo In-Person Attendance
| 2–0
|- style="background:#CFC;"
| 3
| July 28
| @ Portland
| 
| Darius Bazley (20)
| Mike Muscala (6)
| Schröder & Gilgeous-Alexander (7)
| Visa Athletic CenterNo In-Person Attendance
| 3–0

Regular season

|- style="background:#fcc;"
| 1
| October 23
| @ Utah
| 
| Shai Gilgeous-Alexander (26)
| Steven Adams (11)
| Dennis Schröder (4)
| Vivint Smart Home Arena18,306
| 0–1
|- style="background:#fcc;"
| 2
| October 25
| Washington
| 
| Shai Gilgeous-Alexander (28)
| Steven Adams (14)
| Shai Gilgeous-Alexander (4)
| Chesapeake Energy Arena18,203
| 0–2
|- style="background:#cfc;"
| 3
| October 27
| Golden State
| 
| Dennis Schröder (22)
| Gilgeous-Alexander & Adams (9)
| Dennis Schröder (6)
| Chesapeake Energy Arena18,203
| 1–2
|- style="background:#fcc;"
| 4
| October 28
| @ Houston
| 
| Gilgeous-Alexander & Schröder (22)
| Steven Adams (12)
| Dennis Schröder (7)
| Toyota Center18,055
| 1–3
|- style="background:#fcc;"
| 5
| October 30
| Portland
|
| Chris Paul (21)
| Nerlens Noel (14)
| Chris Paul (5)
| Chesapeake Energy Arena18,203
| 1–4

|- style="background:#cfc;"
| 6
| November 2
| New Orleans
|
| Shai Gilgeous-Alexander (23)
| Dennis Schröder (9)
| Chris Paul (9)
| Chesapeake Energy Arena18,203
| 2–4
|- style="background:#cfc;"
| 7
| November 5
| Orlando
| 
| Shai Gilgeous-Alexander (24)
| Steven Adams (11)
| Chris Paul (6)
| Chesapeake Energy Arena18,203
| 3–4
|- style="background:#fcc;"
| 8
| November 7
| @ San Antonio
| 
| Danilo Gallinari (27)
| Nerlens Noel (6)
| Dennis Schröder (9)
| AT&T Center18,354
| 3–5
|- style="background:#cfc;"
| 9
| November 9
| Golden State
| 
| Danilo Gallinari (21)
| Steven Adams (8)
| Chris Paul (9)
| Chesapeake Energy Arena18,203
| 4–5
|- style="background:#fcc;"
| 10
| November 10
| Milwaukee
| 
| Dennis Schröder (25)
| Danilo Gallinari (7)
| Noel & Gilgeous-Alexander (6)
| Chesapeake Energy Arena18,203
| 4–6
|- style="background:#fcc;"
| 11
| November 12
| @ Indiana
| 
| Danilo Gallinari (14)
| Bazley & Gilgeous-Alexander (6)
| Chris Paul (8)
| Bankers Life Fieldhouse15,838
| 4–7
|- style="background:#cfc;"
| 12
| November 15
| Philadelphia
| 
| Danilo Gallinari (28)
| Chris Paul (8)
| Chris Paul (5)
| Chesapeake Energy Arena18,203
| 5–7
|- style="background:#fcc;"
| 13
| November 18
| @ L. A. Clippers
| 
| Chris Paul (22)
| Steven Adams (10)
| Steven Adams (6)
| Staples Center19,068
| 5–8
|- style="background:#fcc;"
| 14
| November 19
| @ L.A. Lakers
| 
| Dennis Schröder (31)
| Nerlens Noel (8)
| Chris Paul (10)
| Staples Center18,997
| 5–9
|- style="background:#fcc;"
| 15
| November 22
| L. A. Lakers
|
| Shai Gilgeous-Alexander (24)
| Shai Gilgeous-Alexander (7)
| Chris Paul (7)
| Chesapeake Energy Arena18,203
| 5–10
|- style="background:#cfc;"
| 16
| November 25
| @ Golden State
| 
| Dennis Schröder (22)
| Steven Adams (10)
| Danilo Gallinari (6)
| Chase Center18,064
| 6–10
|- style="background:#fcc;"
| 17
| November 27
| @ Portland
| 
| Abdel Nader (23)
| Adams & Burton (6)
| Gilgeous-Alexander & Paul (5)
| Moda Center19,870
| 6–11
|- style="background:#cfc;"
| 18
| November 29
| New Orleans
| 
| Dennis Schröder (25)
| Steven Adams (12)
| Dennis Schröder (7)
| Chesapeake Energy Arena18,203
| 7–11

|- style="background:#cfc;"
| 19
| December 1
| @ New Orleans
| 
| Danilo Gallinari (23)
| Danilo Gallinari (11)
| Chris Paul (8)
| Smoothie King Center15,427
| 8–11
|- style="background:#fcc;"
| 20
| December 4
| Indiana
| 
| Steven Adams (20)
| Steven Adams (9)
| Chris Paul (10)
| Chesapeake Energy Arena18,203
| 8–12
|- style="background:#cfc;"
| 21
| December 6
| Minnesota
| 
| Chris Paul (30)
| Steven Adams (11)
| Chris Paul (7)
| Chesapeake Energy Arena18,203
| 9–12
|- style="background:#cfc;"
| 22
| December 8
| @ Portland
| 
| Gilgeous-Alexander & Schröder (21)
| Nerlens Noel (12)
| Steven Adams (4)
| Moda Center19,393
| 10–12
|- style="background:#cfc;"
| 23
| December 9
| @ Utah
| 
| Dennis Schröder (27)
| Steven Adams (13)
| Chris Paul (7)
| Vivint Smart Home Arena18,306
| 11–12
|- style="background:#fcc;"
| 24
| December 11
| @ Sacramento
| 
| Dennis Schröder (17)
| Steven Adams (11)
| Chris Paul (12)
| Golden 1 Center16,723
| 11–13
|- style="background:#fcc;"
| 25
| December 14
| @ Denver
| 
| Dennis Schröder (22)
| Steven Adams (14)
| Chris Paul (10)
| Pepsi Center19,520
| 11–14
|- style="background:#cfc;"
| 26
| December 16
| Chicago
| 
| Chris Paul (30)
| Steven Adams (11)
| Chris Paul (8)
| Chesapeake Energy Arena18,203
| 12–14
|- style="background:#cfc;"
| 27
| December 18
| Memphis
| 
| Dennis Schröder (31)
| Steven Adams (10)
| Dennis Schröder (7)
| Chesapeake Energy Arena18,203
| 13–14
|- style="background:#cfc;"
| 28
| December 20
| Phoenix
| 
| Shai Gilgeous-Alexander (32)
| Schröder & Adams (9)
| Chris Paul (7)
| Chesapeake Energy Arena18,203
| 14–14
|- style="background:#cfc;"
| 29
| December 22
| L. A. Clippers
| 
| Shai Gilgeous-Alexander (32)
| Steven Adams (17)
| Paul & Schröder (6)
| Chesapeake Energy Arena18,203
| 15–14
|- style="background:#fcc;"
| 30
| December 26
| Memphis
| 
| Chris Paul (23)
| Adams & Paul (6)
| Chris Paul (11)
| Chesapeake Energy Arena18,203
| 15–15
|- style="background:#cfc;"
| 31
| December 27
| @ Charlotte
| 
| Shai Gilgeous-Alexander (27)
| Steven Adams (12)
| Chris Paul (6)
| Spectrum Center18,418
| 16–15
|- style="background:#cfc;"
| 32
| December 29
| @ Toronto
| 
| Shai Gilgeous-Alexander (32)
| Chris Paul (11)
| Chris Paul (8)
| Scotiabank Arena19,800
| 17–15
|- style="background:#cfc;"
| 33
| December 31
| Dallas
| 
| Gallinari & Schröder (20)
| Nerlens Noel (12)
| Chris Paul (7)
| Chesapeake Energy Arena18,203
| 18–15

|- style="background:#cfc;"
| 34
| January 2
| @ San Antonio
| 
| Shai Gilgeous-Alexander (25)
| Steven Adams (9)
| Gilgeous-Alexander & Paul (5)
| AT&T Center18,354
| 19–15
|- style="background:#cfc;"
| 35
| January 4
| @ Cleveland
| 
| Dennis Schröder (22)
| Steven Adams (16)
| Chris Paul (10)
| Rocket Mortgage FieldHouse19,432
| 20–15
|- style="background:#fcc;"
| 36
| January 6
| @ Philadelphia
| 
| Steven Adams (24)
| Steven Adams (15)
| Chris Paul (6)
| Wells Fargo Center20,561
| 20–16
|- style="background:#cfc;"
| 37
| January 7
| @ Brooklyn
| 
| Chris Paul (28)
| Steven Adams (18)
| Dennis Schröder (5)
| Barclays Center15,677
| 21–16
|- style="background:#cfc;"
| 38
| January 9
| Houston
| 
| Danilo Gallinari (23)
| Danilo Gallinari (11)
| Chris Paul (5)
| Chesapeake Energy Arena18,203
| 22–16
|- style="background:#fcc;"
| 39
| January 11
| L. A. Lakers
| 
| Gilgeous-Alexander & Gallinari (24)
| Gilgeous-Alexander & Adams (8)
| Chris Paul (8)
| Chesapeake Energy Arena18,203
| 22–17
|- style="background:#cfc;"
| 40
| January 13
| @ Minnesota
| 
| Danilo Gallinari (30)
| Shai Gilgeous-Alexander (20)
| Shai Gilgeous-Alexander (10)
| Target Center11,044
| 23–17
|- style="background:#fcc;"
| 41
| January 15
| Toronto
| 
| Dennis Schröder (25)
| Shai Gilgeous-Alexander (6)
| Chris Paul (11)
| Chesapeake Energy Arena18,203
| 23–18
|- style="background:#fcc;"
| 42
| January 17
| Miami
| 
| Danilo Gallinari (27)
| Dennis Schröder (7)
| Gilgeous-Alexander & Schröder (8)
| Chesapeake Energy Arena18,203
| 23–19
|- style="background:#cfc;"
| 43
| January 18
| Portland
| 
| Chris Paul (30)
| Darius Bazley (13)
| Chris Paul (7)
| Chesapeake Energy Arena18,203
| 24–19
|- style="background:#cfc;"
| 44
| January 20
| @ Houston
| 
| Chris Paul (28)
| Danilo Gallinari (13)
| Dennis Schröder (4)
| Toyota Center18,055
| 25–19
|- style="background:#cfc;"
| 45
| January 22
| @ Orlando
| 
| Dennis Schröder (31)
| Shai Gilgeous-Alexander (12)
| Dennis Schröder (9)
| Amway Center18,846
| 26–19
|- style="background:#cfc;"
| 46
| January 24
| Atlanta
| 
| Danilo Gallinari (25)
| Dennis Schröder (8)
| Dennis Schröder (8)
| Chesapeake Energy Arena18,203
| 27–19
|- style="background:#cfc;"
| 47
| January 25
| @ Minnesota
| 
| Dennis Schröder (26)
| Hamidou Diallo (10)
| Chris Paul (10)
| Chesapeake Energy Arena16,236
| 28–19
|- style="background:#fcc;"
| 48
| January 27
| Dallas
| 
| Dennis Schröder (21)
| Shai Gilgeous-Alexander (11)
| Gallinari & Schröder (6)
| Chesapeake Energy Arena18,203
| 28–20
|- style="background:#cfc;"
| 49
| January 29
| @ Sacramento
| 
| Dennis Schröder (24)
| Steven Adams (8)
| Chris Paul (10)
| Golden 1 Center16,935
| 29–20
|- style="background:#cfc;"
| 50
| January 31
| @ Phoenix
| 
| Danilo Gallinari (27)
| Shai Gilgeous-Alexander (9)
| Chris Paul (10)
| Talking Stick Resort Arena17,260
| 30–20

|- style="background:#cfc;"
| 51
| February 5
| Cleveland
| 
| Dennis Schröder (30)
| Shai Gilgeous-Alexander (10)
| Chris Paul (7)
| Chesapeake Energy Arena18,203
| 31–20
|- style="background:#cfc;"
| 52
| February 7
| Detroit
| 
| Chris Paul (22)
| Danilo Gallinari (9)
| Chris Paul (7)
| Chesapeake Energy Arena18,203
| 32–20
|- style="background:#fcc;"
| 53
| February 9
| Boston
| 
| Gallinari & Gilgeous-Alexander (24)
| Steven Adams (11)
| Chris Paul (5)
| Chesapeake Energy Arena18,203
| 32–21
|- style="background:#fcc;"
| 54
| February 11
| San Antonio
| 
| Chris Paul (31)
| Steven Adams (10)
| Chris Paul (7)
| Chesapeake Energy Arena18,203
| 32–22
|- style="background:#cfc;"
| 55
| February 13
| @ New Orleans
| 
| Danilo Gallinari (29)
| Steven Adams (11)
| Chris Paul (12)
| Smoothie King Center17,865
| 33–22
|- align="center"
|colspan="9" bgcolor="#bbcaff"|All-Star Break
|- style="background:#cfc;"
| 56
| February 21
| Denver
| 
| Chris Paul (29)
| Steven Adams (17)
| Shai Gilgeous-Alexander (9)
| Chesapeake Energy Arena18,203
| 34–22
|- style="background:#cfc;"
| 57
| February 23
| San Antonio
| 
| Shai Gilgeous-Alexander (22)
| Steven Adams (14)
| Chris Paul (10)
| Chesapeake Energy Arena18,203
| 35–22
|- style="background:#cfc;"
| 58
| February 25
| @ Chicago
| 
| Danilo Gallinari (24)
| Shai Gilgeous-Alexander (11)
| Chris Paul (9)
| United Center16,911
| 36–22
|- style="background:#cfc;"
| 59
| February 27
| Sacramento
| 
| Danilo Gallinari (24)
| Adams & Noel (7)
| Paul & Schröder (7)
| Chesapeake Energy Arena18,203
| 37–22
|- style="background:#fcc;"
| 60
| February 28
| @ Milwaukee
| 
| Chris Paul (18)
| Steven Adams (7)
| Chris Paul (5)
| Fiserv Forum18,412
| 37–23

|- style="background:#fcc;"
| 61
| March 3
| L. A. Clippers
| 
| Dennis Schröder (24)
| Steven Adams (10)
| Chris Paul (7)
| Chesapeake Energy Arena18,203
| 37–24
|- style="background:#cfc;"
| 62
| March 4
| @ Detroit
| 
| Shai Gilgeous-Alexander (27)
| Adams & Gallinari (7)
| Dennis Schröder (9)
| Little Caesars Arena15,138
| 38–24
|- style="background:#cfc;"
| 63
| March 6
| @ New York
| 
| Danilo Gallinari (22)
| Steven Adams (11)
| Chris Paul (12)
| Madison Square Garden16,277
| 39–24
|- style="background:#cfc;"
| 64
| March 8
| @ Boston
| 
| Chris Paul (28)
| Nerlens Noel (9)
| Chris Paul (7)
| TD Garden19,156
| 40–24

|- style="background:#cfc;"
| 65
| August 1
| Utah
| 
| Shai Gilgeous-Alexander (19)
| Steven Adams (11)
| Chris Paul (7)
| The ArenaNo In-Person Attendance
| 41–24
|- style="background:#fcc;"
| 66
| August 3
| Denver
| 
| Shai Gilgeous-Alexander (24)
| Steven Adams (10)
| Chris Paul (8)
| The ArenaNo In-Person Attendance
| 41–25
|- style="background:#cfc;"
| 67
| August 5
| @ L. A. Lakers
| 
| Chris Paul (21)
| 4 players (7)
| Chris Paul (6)
| HP Field HouseNo In-Person Attendance
| 42–25
|- style="background:#fcc;"
| 68
| August 7
| @ Memphis
| 
| Chris Paul (17)
| Hamidou Diallo (8)
| Chris Paul (5)
| Visa Athletic CenterNo In-Person Attendance
| 42–26
|- style="background:#cfc;"
| 69
| August 9
| Washington
| 
| Darius Bazley (23)
| Luguentz Dort (10)
| Chris Paul (9)
| The ArenaNo In-Person Attendance
| 43–26
|- style="background:#fcc;"
| 70
| August 10
| @ Phoenix
| 
| Darius Bazley (22)
| Darius Bazley (10)
| Chris Paul (7)
| HP Field HouseNo In-Person Attendance
| 43–27
|- style="background:#cfc;"
| 71
| August 12
| Miami
| 
| Darius Bazley (21)
| Darius Bazley (9)
| Terrance Ferguson (5)
| Visa Athletic CenterNo In-Person Attendance
| 44–27
|- style="background:#fcc;"
| 72
| August 14
| @ L. A. Clippers
| 
|Hamidou Diallo (27)
|Hamidou Diallo (11)
|Deonte Burton (5)
| HP Field HouseNo In-Person Attendance
|44–28

|- style="background:#;"
| 65
| March 11
| Utah
| 
|
|
|
| Chesapeake Energy Arena
|
|- style="background:#;"
| 66
| March 13
| Minnesota
| 
|
|
|
| Chesapeake Energy Arena
|
|- style="background:#;"
| 67
| March 15
| @ Washington
| 
|
|
|
| Capital One Arena
|
|- style="background:#;"
| 68
| March 17
| @ Memphis
| 
|
|
|
| FedExForum
|
|- style="background:#;"
| 69
| March 18
| @ Atlanta
| 
|
|
|
| State Farm Arena
|
|- style="background:#;"
| 70
| March 20
| Denver
| 
|
|
|
| Chesapeake Energy Arena
|
|- style="background:#;"
| 71
| March 23
| @ Miami
| 
|
|
|
| American Airlines Arena
|
|- style="background:#;"
| 72
| March 26
| Charlotte
| 
|
|
|
| Chesapeake Energy Arena
|
|- style="background:#;"
| 73
| March 28
| @ Golden State
| 
|
|
|
| Chase Center
|
|- style="background:#;"
| 74
| March 30
| @ Denver
| 
|
|
|
| Pepsi Center
|
|- style="background:#;"
| 75
| April 1
| Phoenix
| 
|
|
|
| Chesapeake Energy Arena
|
|- style="background:#;"
| 76
| April 4
| @ LA Clippers
| 
|
|
|
| Staples Center
|
|- style="background:#;"
| 77
| April 5
| @ LA Lakers
| 
|
|
|
| Staples Center
|
|- style="background:#;"
| 78
| April 7
| Brooklyn
| 
|
|
|
| Chesapeake Energy Arena
|
|- style="background:#;"
| 79
| April 10
| New York
| 
|
|
|
| Chesapeake Energy Arena
|
|- style="background:#;"
| 80
| April 11
| @ Memphis
| 
|
|
|
| FedExForum
|
|- style="background:#;"
| 81
| April 13
| Utah
| 
|
|
|
| Chesapeake Energy Arena
|
|- style="background:#;"
| 82
| April 15
| @ Dallas
| 
|
|
|
| American Airlines Center
|

Playoffs

|- style="background:#fcc;"
| 1
| August 18
| @ Houston
| 
| Danilo Gallinari (29)
| Steven Adams (12)
| Chris Paul (9)
| HP Field HouseNo In-Person Attendance
| 0–1
|- style="background:#fcc;"
| 2
| August 20
| @Houston
| 
| Shai Gilgeous-Alexander (31)
| Steven Adams (11)
| Dennis Schröder (5)
| The ArenaNo In-Person Attendance
| 0–2
|- style="background:#cfc;"
| 3
| August 22
|Houston
| 
| Dennis Schröder (29)
| Steven Adams (13)
| Shai Gilgeous-Alexander (6)
| HP Field HouseNo In-Person Attendance
| 1–2
|- style="background:#cfc;"
| 4
| August 24
| Houston
| 
| Dennis Schröder (30)
| Shai Gilgeous-Alexander (12)
| Shai Gilgeous-Alexander (6)
| The ArenaNo In-Person Attendance
| 2–2
|- style="background:#fcc;"
| 5
| August 29
| @ Houston
| 
| Dennis Schröder (19)
| Steven Adams (12)
| Shai Gilgeous-Alexander (4)
| HP Field HouseNo In-Person Attendance
| 2–3
|- style="background:#cfc;"
| 6
| August 31
| Houston
| 
| Chris Paul (28)
| Steven Adams (14)
| Shai Gilgeous-Alexander (6)
| The ArenaNo In-Person Attendance
| 3–3
|- style="background:#fcc;"
| 7
| September 2
| @ Houston
| 
| Luguentz Dort (30)
| Chris Paul (11)
| Chris Paul (12)
| The ArenaNo In-Person Attendance
| 3–4

Player statistics

Regular season

 Led team in statistic
After all games.
‡ Waived during the season
† Traded during the season
≠ Acquired during the season

Playoffs

 Led team in statistic
After all games.

Totals

Regular season

|-
| align="left"| || align="center"| C
| 63||63 || 1,689 || style=";"|583 || 146 || 51 || 67 || 684
|-
| align="left"| || align="center"|PF
|61 ||9 ||1,130 ||246  || 41||23 || 41 ||342
|-
| align="left"| || align="center"| SG
| 39 || 0 || 356 || 57 || 17 || 7 || 10 || 104
|-
| align="left"| || align="center"| SG
| 21 || 3 || 896 || 167 || 36 || 37 || 9 || 318
|-
| align="left"||| align="center"| SG
| 36 || 28 ||820 || 81 || 27 || 31 || 4 || 244
|-
| align="left"| || align="center"| SG
| 56 || 38 || 1,257 || 74 || 51 || 27 || 17 || 220
|-
| align="left"| || align="center"| PF
| 62 || 62 ||1,834 || 322|| 119 || 42||5 ||1,160
|-
| align="left"| || align="center"| SG
| style=";"|70 || style=";"|70 || style=";"|2,428|| 412 || 232 || 79 ||47 || style=";"|1,331
|-
| align="left"| || align="center"| SG
| 11 || 0 || 7 || 13 || 4 || 1 || 5 || 20
|-
| align="left"| || align="center"| PF
| 10 || 0 || 12 ||5 || 1 || 1 || 1 || 17
|-
| align="left"| || align="center"|C
| 47 || 2 || 572 || 108|| 40 || 9 || 12 || 226
|-
| align="left"| || align="center"| PF
| 55 || 6 || 572 || 100 || 38 || 23 || 20 || 241
|-
| align="left"| || align="center"| C
| 61 || 7 || 1,127 || 300 || 57 || 59 || style=";"|91 || 449
|-
| align="left"|† || align="center"| C
| 5 || 0 ||24 ||5 || 2 || 0 || 0 ||9
|-
| align="left"| || align="center"| PG
|style=";"|70 ||style=";"|70 || 2,208|| 349 ||style=";"| 472 || style=";"|111 || 11 || 1,232
|-
| align="left"| || align="center"| SG
| 7 ||0 || 87 || 27 || 4 || 1 || 3 || 20
|-
| align="left"|≠|| align="center"| SF
| 3 || 0 || 11 || 2|| 0 ||0||0 ||0
|-
| align="left"| || align="center"| PG
| 65 || 2 || 1,999 || 236|| 262 || 45|| 14 || 1,229
|}
After all games.
‡Waived during the season
†Traded during the season
≠Acquired during the season

Playoffs

|-
| align="left"| || align="center"| C
| style=";"|7 ||style=";"| 7 || 210 || style=";"|81 || 9 || 4 || 2 || 71
|-
| align="left"| || align="center"|PF
|style=";"|7 ||0 ||126 ||47  || 6||0 || 3 ||46
|-
| align="left"| || align="center"| SG
| 1 || 0 || 2 || 0 || 0 || 0 || 0 || 0
|-
| align="left"| || align="center"| SG
| 3 || 0 || 25|| 6 || 1 || 0 || 2 || 13
|-
| align="left"||| align="center"| SG
| 6|| 6 ||175 || 22 || 6|| 2 || style=";"|6 || 75
|-
| align="left"| || align="center"| SG
| 4 || 1 || 42 || 4 || 1 || 1|| 0 || 6
|-
| align="left"| || align="center"| PF
| style=";"|7 ||style=";"| 7 ||212 || 38|| 7 || 5||1 ||105
|-
| align="left"| || align="center"| SG
| style=";"|7|| style=";"|7 ||style=";"|279|| 37 || 29 || 7 ||3 ||114
|-
| align="left"| || align="center"|C
| 2 || 0 || 20 ||4|| 1|| 0|| 0|| 3
|-
| align="left"| || align="center"| PF
| 3 ||0 || 25|| 3 || 0 || 1 || 2|| 4
|-
| align="left"| || align="center"| C
| style=";"|7 || 0 || 97 || 29 || 3 ||2|| 5 || 21
|-
| align="left"| || align="center"| PG
|style=";"|7 ||style=";"|7 || 261|| 52||style=";"| 37|| style=";"|11 || 3 || style=";"|149
|-
| align="left"| || align="center"| SG
| 1 ||0 ||3 ||0 || 0 || 0 || 0 || 0
|-
| align="left"| || align="center"| PG
| style=";"|7 || 0||227|| 26|| 25|| 4|| 1 || 121
|}

Individual game highs

Awards and records

Awards

Transactions

Overview

Trades

Free agency

Re-signed

Additions

Subtractions

References

Oklahoma City Thunder seasons
Oklahoma City Thunder
Oklahoma City Thunder
Oklahoma City Thunder